Ernestine Friedrichsen (29 June 1824, Danzig - 21 July 1892, Düsseldorf) was a German genre painter; primarily of family scenes.

Biography 
Little is known about her early life. In the 1850s, she took private art lessons in Düsseldorf with Marie Wiegmann; focusing on portrait painting. Later, she studied with Wilhelm Sohn and learned genre painting from Rudolf Jordan. 

She made numerous study trips, to Holland, Belgium, England and Italy, as well as to places within Germany, such as Holstein, Bavaria and Masuria, which she found especially amenable as a source of inspiration. The January Uprising and the Jewish communities in Poland were also recurring motifs in her work. 

Her first showing came in 1861 at an academic exhibition in Dresden. She maintained a private studio in Düsseldorf from 1867 until her death. 

She was also a member of the Verein der Berliner Künstlerinnen, an association of female artists. In 1884, Kaiser Wilhelm I purchased her painting, "Sommerlust". By that time, her works had become collectors' items outside of Germany. Eventually, she exhibited in Dresden, Berlin, Munich and Hamburg.

References

Further reading 
"Friedrichsen, Ernestine". In: Hermann Alexander Müller: Biographisches Künstler-Lexikon. Die bekanntesten Zeitgenossen auf dem Gebiet der bildenden Künste aller Länder mit Angabe ihrer Werke. Bibliographisches Institut, Leipzig 1882, pg.186.
 Ariane Neuhaus-Koch (Ed.): Dem Vergessen entgegen. Frauen in der Geistesgeschichte Düsseldorfs. Lebensbilder und Chroniken. Ahasvera-Verlag, Neuss 1989, pgs.35–36.
 "Friedrichsen, Ernestine". In: Allgemeines Künstlerlexikon. Die Bildenden Künstler aller Zeiten und Völker. Vol.45. Saur, München, Leipzig 2005, pg.177.

External links 

 "Friedrichsen, Ernestine" In: Meyers Großes Konversations-Lexikon, Vol.7. Leipzig 1907, pgs.144–145.
 "Friedrichsen, Ernestine" In: Brockhaus' Konversations-Lexikon, Vol.7, F. A. Brockhaus, Leipzig, Berlin und Wien 1894, pg.354.
 "Ernestine Friedrichsen" In: Historische Wohnorte von bekannten Frauen der Düsseldorfer Kulturszene

1824 births
1892 deaths
19th-century German painters
German genre painters
German women painters
Military personnel from Gdańsk